Skipper Badenhorst (born 1 December 1978 in Oudtshoorn, South Africa) is a rugby union player for the Cheetahs in the Super Rugby competition and Namibia. He plays as a hooker.

Career
Skipper matriculated in 1996 from Afrikaanse Hoër Seunskool also known as Affies. The team of 1996 won all 27 of its matches, accounting for such opponents as Maritzburg College, Grey College and Pretoria Boys High School.  The score against Boys’ High was a record 62-13.  That team won the Beeld Trophy (the descendant of the Administrator's Cup and the Director's Trophy) for a record third successive year.

He played in the South African Under 21 team of 1999 alongside John Smit and fellow alumni Johan Roets, Eugene Marx and Sarel Eloff. This team went on to win the equivalent of the under 21 world cup. Skipper has played provincial rugby for the Valke and Pumas before moving on to the Sharks. He has played Super Rugby for the Stormers, the Sharks and the Cheetahs.

References

https://web.archive.org/web/20080720003026/http://www.rugby365.com/schools/profiles/585353.htm

External links
Sharks profile

1978 births
Living people
People from Oudtshoorn
Afrikaner people
Namibian rugby union players
Sharks (rugby union) players
Sharks (Currie Cup) players
Bulls (rugby union) players
Stormers players
Pumas (Currie Cup) players
Cheetahs (rugby union) players
Rugby union hookers
South African people of German descent
South African people of Dutch descent
South African emigrants to Namibia
Free State Cheetahs players
Namibia international rugby union players